Zang Kejia (8 October 1905 – 5 February 2004) was a Chinese poet.

He was born in Zhucheng, Shandong province. Zang entered the Shandong Provincial First Normal School in 1923 and later trained at the Wuhan Branch of the Central Military and Political School.

In 1929, he went to Qingdao University, and under the guidance of Wen Yiduo began publishing poetry.  His first collection, Laoyin (Brand) appeared in 1937. Other collections followed.

With the outbreak of the Second Sino-Japanese War, Zang did cultural propaganda work for the army, and collections of his were published as well as volumes of army poetry. After the war, he was involved in editorial activities and published his first collection of short stories and prose.

After the founding of the People's Republic of China, he held several important positions, among them as chief editor of Poetry magazine.  He also co-edited the "Selected Poems of Chairman Mao" with Zhou Zhenfu.

External links 
 http://www.china.org.cn/english/culture/86460.htm

Republic of China poets
People's Republic of China poets
1905 births
2004 deaths
People's Republic of China politicians from Shandong
Politicians from Weifang
Poets from Shandong
20th-century poets
People from Zhucheng
Writers from Weifang